Dr. Cipto Mangunkusumo National Central Public Hospital (abbreviated as RSUPN Dr. Cipto Mangunkusumo or  RSCM), is a government-run hospital located at Salemba in Jakarta, Indonesia. The hospital was established in 1919 as the Centrale Burgelijke Ziekeninrichting (CBZ), which has undergone various changes in name and status since then.  Since 1964 it is named after Cipto Mangunkusumo, an Indonesian independence leader and Sukarno's political mentor. It is a government-run general hospital as well serving as teaching hospital for the University of Indonesia. RSCM provides primary, secondary, and tertiary care, acts as a national referral center for government hospitals, and is a place for general practitioners, specialist doctors and subspecialists, nurses and other health workers. The hospital has almost all advanced diagnostic and therapeutic medical technology.

History and Etymology

The Dr. Cipto Mangunkusumo Hospital history is related to University of Indonesia. In 1851 the colonial Dutch East Indies  governments established a medical assistant school that lasted for two years, and the graduates were certified to provide basic medical treatments. The degree conferred was Javanese Doctor, as the graduates were certified only to open their practice in the Dutch East Indies, especially Java. The program became more comprehensive; by 1864, it was expanded to three years. By 1875, the program of the study had reached seven years and the graduates were entitled to the degree of Medical Doctor.

The hospital was used by the Imperial Japanese Army from 1942 to 1945. In 1945, the name changed to Rumah Sakit Oemoem Negri (RSON). Then in 1945, the renamed again as Rumah Sakit Umum Pusat (RSUP). After independence, in 1964 the name changed to Rumah Sakit Tijpto Mangunkusumo (RSTM), now RSCM to match with Indonesian language. In 1994, the hospital was renamed  Rumah Sakit Umum Pusat Dr. Cipto Mangunkusumo (RSUP Dr. Cipto Mangunkusumo).
In 2008 a new building was opened, which is now the main hospital building with a capacity of nearly 700 beds. In 2010 RSCM Kencana building with an integrated laboratory was inaugurated. In 2013 the Kirana RSCM building for eye care service was opened, which is a  6-storey building located at Jalan Kimia, Cikini, Central Jakarta. The Center for Maternal and Child Health (PKIA) was inaugurated in 2014, which is housed in a 12-story building.

References 

Hospitals in Jakarta
Medical schools in Indonesia
Buildings and structures completed in 1919